The 1986 VFL Grand Final was an Australian rules football game contested between the  Hawthorn Football Club and the Carlton Football Club.  The game was played at the Melbourne Cricket Ground (MCG) in Melbourne on 27 September 1986. It was the 90th annual grand final of the Victorian Football League (VFL), staged to determine the premiers for the 1986 VFL season. The match, attended by 101,861 spectators, was won by Hawthorn by a margin of 42 points, marking that club's sixth premiership victory.

Background

Hawthorn were playing their fourth successive grand final and had lost the last two, while Carlton were appearing in their first premiership decider since winning the 1982 VFL Grand Final. At the conclusion of the home and away season, Hawthorn had finished first on the VFL ladder with 18 wins and 4 losses. Carlton had finished third (behind Sydney) with 15 wins and 7 losses.

In the finals series in the lead-up to the game, Carlton defeated Sydney in the qualifying final before meeting the Hawks in the second semi-final, which the Blues won by 28 points to advance to the grand final. Hawthorn, after this loss, convincingly defeated Fitzroy by 56 points in the preliminary final to advance to the grand final. Hawthorn entered the game as slight favourites despite their defeat to the Blues in the second semi-final.

Hawks player Robert DiPierdomenico won the Brownlow Medal in the week leading up to the game. Meanwhile, the Blues were looking to give Bruce Doull, who was retiring after the game, a winning finish to his 18-season career.

Match summary

The Hawks jumped out of the blocks early and by early in the second quarter led by 37 points.  A seven-goal burst by the Hawks in the third quarter sealed their win. In the final quarter Hawthorn kicked only one goal but by then the contest was effectively over. Hawthorn's Jason Dunstall, who was in just his second VFL season, kicked six goals to help the Hawks to victory, while Gary Buckenara kicked four goals for the Hawks, all of them in the first half of the game.

The Norm Smith Medal was awarded to Hawthorn defender Gary Ayres for being judged the best player afield. Ayres was playing on Carlton wingman David Rhys-Jones, who had been a match-winner against Hawthorn in the second semi-final. Ayres, playing on the wing for the first time in five years, nullified Rhys-Jones and set up many attacking moves for the Hawks.

Teams

Goalkickers

References
Hawks Headquarters page on the 1986 Grand Final
 The Official statistical history of the AFL 2004 
 Ross, J. (ed), 100 Years of Australian Football 1897-1996: The Complete Story of the AFL, All the Big Stories, All the Great Pictures, All the Champions, Every AFL Season Reported, Viking, (Ringwood), 1996.

See also
 1986 VFL season

VFL/AFL Grand Finals
VFL
VFL Grand Final
Hawthorn Football Club
Carlton Football Club